Nachman Nathan Coronel (1810 – 6 August 1890) was a Jerusalemite Jewish scholar.

Biography
Coronel was born in Amsterdam to a Sephardic father and Ashkenazic mother. His teacher was Rabbi Abraham Susan. In 1830 he emigrated to Safed, Palestine, where he married, afterward settling in Jerusalem. There he studied in the Sephardic yeshiva. He became especially interested in rabbinical manuscripts, and acquired many rare copies, some of which he sold to European libraries, while others he published with his own annotations. 

Coronel was awarded by the Emperor of Austria the gold medal for art and science.

Publications
  Containing a varied version of Berakhot, manuscripts of Cairo, and decisions by Isaiah di Trani the Elder, with an introduction by Coronel.
  Containing a liturgy of the geonic period.
  Rules for the slaughter and examination of animals, by Rabbi Jonah.
  Selected religious regulations for travelers.
  Decisions by Solomon ben Adret in reference to appropriating ḥallah (the priests' share of the dough), and decisions by Jacob ben Zahal of Jerusalem. Coronel, in his own essay, Ḥakor Davar [Search out a Matter], attempted to establish a precedent for the exemption, like the Levite tithe, of the appropriation of ḥallah outside the Holy Land, for which he was rebuked by the rabbis of Jerusalem.
  By Menahem Azariah da Fano, with Coronel's commentary.

References

1810 births
1890 deaths
19th-century Dutch rabbis
19th-century rabbis in Jerusalem
19th-century Sephardi Jews
Book and manuscript collectors
Emigrants from the Dutch Republic to the Ottoman Empire
Writers from Jerusalem